The following elections occurred in the year 1958.

 1958 Cardinal electors in Papal conclave
 1958 Papal conclave

Africa
 1958 French Togoland parliamentary election
 1958 Nigerien Constituent Assembly election
 1958 South African general election
 1958 Southern Rhodesian general election
 1958 Sudanese parliamentary election
 1958–1959 Tanganyikan general election
 1958 Ugandan general election

Asia
 1958 Laotian parliamentary election
 1958 Singapore City Council by-election
 1958 Soviet Union legislative election
 1958 Japanese general election
 1958 Lebanese presidential election

Europe
 1958 Finnish parliamentary election
 1958 French presidential election
 1958 Greek legislative election
 1958 Belgian general election
 1958 Albanian parliamentary election
 1958 Portuguese presidential election
 1958 Soviet Union legislative election
 1958 Swedish general election
 1958 Italian general election

France
 1958 French constitutional referendum
 1958 French legislative election

United Kingdom
 1958 Islington North by-election
 1958 Northern Ireland general election
 1958 Rochdale by-election
 1958 Torrington by-election

North America

Canada
 1958 Canadian federal election
 1958 Edmonton municipal election
 1958 Manitoba general election
 1958 Ottawa municipal election
 1958 Toronto municipal election
 1958 Yukon general election

Caribbean
 1958 West Indies federal elections

Mexico
 1958 Mexican general election

United States
 United States House of Representatives elections in California, 1958
 1958 California gubernatorial election
 1958 Maine gubernatorial election
 1958 Massachusetts gubernatorial election
 1958 Minnesota gubernatorial election
 1958 New Orleans mayoral election
 1958 New York state election
 United States House of Representatives elections in South Carolina, 1958
 1958 South Carolina gubernatorial election
 1958 United States House of Representatives elections
 1958 United States Senate elections

United States gubernatorial
 1958 Oregon gubernatorial election

United States Senate
 1958 United States Senate elections
 United States Senate election in Massachusetts, 1958
 United States Senate election in North Dakota, 1958

South America 
 1958 Argentine general election
 1958 Chilean presidential election
 1958 Guatemalan general election
 1958 Salvadoran legislative election
 1958 Uruguayan general election
 1958 Venezuelan presidential election

Oceania

Australia
 1958 Australian federal election

See also

 
1958
Elections